Mary Euphrasia Pelletier (31 July 1796 in Noirmoutier-en-l'Île – 24 April 1868 in Angers), born Rose Virginie Pelletier, was a French Roman Catholic nun, best known as the foundress of the Congregation of Our Lady of Charity of the Good Shepherd.

Pelletier was born on an island off the coast of France where her parents had been exiled by the French Revolutionaries. She was christened Rose Virginie Pelletier and at the age of eighteen joined the Order of Our Lady of Charity who cared for girls and women in difficulty. Some of the girls were abandoned by their families or orphaned, some had turned to prostitution in order to survive. The Sisters of Our Lady of Charity provided shelter, food, vocational training and an opportunity for these girls and women to turn their lives around. Pelletier formed the Congregation of Our Lady of Charity of the Good Shepherd to expand this apostolate to wherever needed.

Pelletier died in Angers, France, in 1868 and was canonized by Pope Pius XII in 1940. Her feast day is 24 April.

Biography 

Pelletier was born on 31 July 1796 on Noirmoutier a small island off the northwest coast of France. Her parents had fled there thinking that they could escape the violence of the French Revolution. She was the 8th child of Julian and Anne Pelletier. Her father died when she was ten years old. In 1810 her mother placed Pelletier in a boarding school in Tours. Her mother died in 1813.

Near the boarding school was the convent of the Order of Our Lady of Charity of the Refuge, a religious Congregation founded by John Eudes to provide care and protection for women and girls who were homeless and at risk of exploitation. Despite her guardian's reservations Pelletier was allowed to join the sisters provided that she not make her vows before she turned 21. She made her profession in 1816, taking the name of Mary of Saint Euphrasia. The sisters of the community had been dispersed at one point during the revolution; the majority had been imprisoned. Pelletier joined what was a community of elderly weary sisters. A short time after her profession, she became first mistress of the penitents, and about eight years later was made superioress of the house of Tours. She founded a community, the "Sisters Magdalen" for women who wanted to lead a contemplative and enclosed life and would support, by their ministry of prayer, the different works of the Congregation. It is now known as the Contemplatives of the Good Shepherd.

Sisters of the Good Shepherd 

The city of Angers asked that Pelletier establish a Convent of Refuge there. She established a house in an old factory and called it "Bon Pasteur" (Good Shepherd). In 1831 she was appointed as Mother Superior of the house in Angers. The congregation in Tours did not wish to expand to Angers, nor did the house in Nantes. Eudes had established his houses as separate and autonomous. Pelletier came to believe that if the work was to grow, that each house should be under the direction of a generalate. She founded additional convents in Le Mans, Poitiers, Grenoble and Metz.

In April 1835, Pope Gregory XVI granted approval of the Mother-House at Angers for the institute known as Congregation of Our Lady of Charity of the Good Shepherd of Angers. Convents that developed for Angers would be part of the institute while those houses that did not attach themselves to the General Administration would remain Refuges. The development of the Generalate made possible the sending of the sisters to wherever they were needed. Convents were also established in Italy, Belgium, Germany, and England. The institute is directly subject to the Holy See; Cardinal Odescalchi was its first cardinal-protector.

For some time, Pelletier had to deal with the opposition of the Bishop Angebault of Angers, who wished to exercise the authority of Superior General, although the constitutions of the Order did not provide for this. She was accused of ambition, of innovation, and of disobedience. Sometimes she was put in the position of addressing conflicting instructions from Rome and the bishop. Although she had the support of Rome, the local clergy tended to keep their distance from someone who had incurred the bishop's displeasure. According to Sister Norma O'Shea, the bishop's opposition, coupled with the deaths of a number of sisters and longtime supporters, made Pelletier's last years very lonely.

Pelletier devoted herself to the work entrusted to her. By 1868, she was Superior General of 3,000 religious, in 110 convents, in thirty-five countries. She died of cancer on 24 April 1868. She is buried on the property of the Motherhouse of the Sisters of the Good Shepherd in Angers, France.

Canonisation 

On 11 December 1897, Pope Leo XIII declared Pelletier "Venerable." She was beatified on 30 April 1933 and canonised on
2 May 1940 by Pope Pius XII.

Quotations 

 "Though old stars burn out and die, look to the new and even beyond."
 "Go after the lost sheep without other rest than the cross, other consolation than work, other thirst than for justice."
 "You have to adapt to all circumstances. Do the best you can, while remembering that, according to the spirit of our calling, we must be everything to everyone."
 "Do well all that you do."

Legacy 
Approximately 5500 Sisters of the Good Shepherd, active and contemplative, serve in 72 countries.

See also 
 Mary of the Divine Heart

References

Further reading
 The Story of St. Mary Euphrasia Pelletier, Good Shepherd sisters, Province of Singapore-Malaysia (2014)

External links 

 Congregation of Our Lady of Charity of the Good Shepherd
 Contemplative Sisters of the Good Shepherd
 Good Shepherd Sisters founder statue in St. Peter's Basilica

1796 births
1868 deaths
People from Vendée
French Roman Catholic saints
19th-century Christian saints
Christian female saints of the Late Modern era
Canonizations by Pope Pius XII